Julia Sergeyevna Apostoli ( Salnikova; Russian: Юлия Сергеевна Апостоли, Greek: Τζούλια Σεργκέιεβνα Αποστόλη; born 13 August 1964) is a Russian-born Greek former professional tennis player who represented the Soviet Union and (from 1990 onwards) Greece.

Biography
Apostoli was born in Moscow, the daughter of Russian football player and manager Sergei Salnikov. Her father was a member of the Soviet association football national team which won the gold medal at the 1956 Summer Olympics, and at club level both played and managed FC Spartak Moscow.

She debuted for the Soviet Union Fed Cup team in the 1980 quarterfinal loss to the United States, featuring in the doubles with Olga Zaitseva, a dead rubber which they lost to the Americans. Over the next two years she competed in all ties for the Soviet Union. In 1981 she played the opening rubber in each tie and won them all, over Denmark's Tine Scheuer-Larsen, Czechoslovakia's Renáta Tomanová and Britain's Virginia Wade, the latter in the Soviet Union's quarter-final loss. She extended her singles record to five wins from five matches in 1982 when she beat her Spanish and Peruvian opponents, also appearing in a live doubles rubber to win the second round tie against Peru. In the 1982 quarter-final she suffered her only singles loss, to Dianne Fromholtz, as the Soviet Union went down to Australia.

At the Friendship Games in 1984, Apostoli won a gold medal in women's doubles, as well as a bronze in the singles.

She rarely featured in international tennis for the remainder of the 1980s in order to concentrate on her studies, graduating with a journalism degree from Moscow State University in 1990.

Apostoli returned to tennis in 1990 under the flag of Greece, having taken up citizenship through her marriage to Greek tennis coach Apostolos Tsitsipas. She played on the WTA Tour until 1992.

Her eldest son, Stefanos Tsitsipas, competes on the professional ATP tour.

Apostoli has four children with her husband, and all of them are tennis players. She lives in Monaco when not traveling. She is also officially listed as a coach of her younger son Petros Tsitsipas on his ATP profile.

ITF finals

Singles: 4 (3–1)

Doubles: 4 (1–3)

Other finals

Singles (0-1)

Doubles (0-2)

Mixed (2-1)

References

External links
 
 
 

1964 births
Living people
Greek female tennis players
Soviet female tennis players
Russian female tennis players
Russian people of Greek descent
Russian emigrants to Greece
Moscow State University alumni
Friendship Games medalists in tennis
Tennis players from Moscow